Alexander W. Brewster (5 June 1796 – 6 May 1851) was a prominent merchant and manufacturer, as well as a politician and educator in Erie, Pennsylvania.

Career 
Brewster was a local educator. He taught at the Grubb Schoolhouse in Mill Creek, Pennsylvania, in 1818. He taught at a log house at 7th and Holland in Erie, and at the Erie Academy.

He served as sheriff of Erie County, Pennsylvania, from 1828 to 1831. He served as a burgess in Erie, Pennsylvania, in 1849.

He was the first person buried at Erie Cemetery, a graveyard he helped organize. The Brewster Home, on East 5th Street between Holland and French Streets in Erie, was originally built in 1823 and restored by Erie Insurance in 1984.

References

1796 births
1851 deaths
Mayors of Erie, Pennsylvania
Pennsylvania sheriffs
19th-century American politicians